Sing 2 is a 2021 American computer-animated jukebox musical comedy film produced by Illumination and distributed by Universal Pictures. The sequel to Sing (2016) and the second film in the franchise, it was again written and directed by Garth Jennings, co-directed by Christophe Lourdelet, and produced by Chris Meledandri and Janet Healy.

The film stars an ensemble cast consisting of Matthew McConaughey, Reese Witherspoon, Scarlett Johansson, Taron Egerton, Tori Kelly, Nick Kroll, Jennings, Peter Serafinowicz, Jennifer Saunders, and Nick Offerman, reprising their roles from the first film. It also features new characters voiced by Bobby Cannavale, Bono, Halsey, Pharrell Williams, Chelsea Peretti, Letitia Wright, and Eric André. Like the first film, Sing 2 features songs from many artists, most of which are performed diegetically. The story is set after the events of the previous film with Buster Moon and his group putting on a show in Redshore City while working to impress an entertainment mogul and enlist a reclusive rock star to perform with the group.

Sing 2 made its world premiere at the AFI Fest on November 14, 2021, and was theatrically released in the United States on December 22, 2021, by Universal Pictures. The film has met with positive reviews and grossed over $408 million worldwide against a production budget of $85 million, becoming the highest-grossing animated film of 2021 and the tenth-highest-grossing film of 2021.

Plot

Sometime after the events of the first film, Buster Moon is thriving with his newly rebuilt theater; Johnny, Meena, Rosita, Gunter, and Miss Crawly work as his crew while Ash performs as a soloist. They fail to impress Suki Lane, a talent scout dog working at Crystal Entertainment, who tells Buster he would not make it in nearby Redshore City. Encouraged by Nana Noodleman, Buster reunites his crew, and they head off to the city to make an impression.

They are denied entry into Crystal Entertainment but sneak in for an audition with entertainment mogul wolf Jimmy Crystal. As Jimmy is uninterested in Buster's original show pitch, Gunter suggests a space-themed sci-fi musical that features songs from Clay Calloway, a legendary rock star lion who has not been seen in 15 years after his wife Ruby died. Intrigued and assuming Clay will be a part of the show, Jimmy greenlights it.

Miss Crawly finds where Clay lives and goes to visit him, but he scares her away with a series of booby traps. During production, Rosita develops a fear of heights, prompting Buster to give Rosita's role to Jimmy's daughter, Porsha, on his insistence while Rosita is relegated to a minor role. Johnny has been assigned to work with top choreographer monkey Klaus Kickenklober, but his harsh teaching methods leave Johnny unable to learn. Johnny later comes across a street dancer lynx named Nooshy, who agrees to help him out. Meena has been cast in a romantic scene with Darius, an egocentric actor yak. Having never been in love, Meena is unable to get the feelings across during their scene. She later meets and falls in love with an ice cream vendor elephant named Alfonso. Jimmy eventually finds out that Buster never contacted Clay about the show and threatens to harm Buster if he does not deliver.  

Ash and Buster visit Clay to convince him to be in the show. He refuses at first, but Ash changes his mind. Back at the theater, Buster asks Porsha to switch roles with Rosita, as Porsha's acting skills are poor. Porsha misinterprets this as Buster firing her and runs off. An outraged Jimmy nearly drops Buster off his penthouse roof after news of the supposed firing is broadcast on television before locking him in a closet. Suki later frees Buster and warns him to leave Redshore City before Jimmy can kill him. Ash arrives at the hotel room with the crew and Clay, who advises Buster not to run and hide as he did. Buster decides to have the cast and crew put on the show that night behind Jimmy's back after he witnesses Jimmy insulting him and his friends on television. Porsha rejoins the show, Johnny calls his father and his gang to come over and keep Jimmy and his bodyguards at bay, and Rosita calls her husband Norman to let their children distract security.

During the show, a jealous Klaus takes the place of Johnny's performance partner to undermine his number, but Johnny defeats Klaus with encouragement from Nooshy and the other dancers, finally earning Klaus' respect. Porsha performs a high energy song and dance number, standing up to her angry father. Meena visualizes Darius as Alfonso, and successfully performs a romantic duet with him. In a last attempt to stop the show, Jimmy drops Buster off a high catwalk, which forces Rosita to overcome her fear of heights to save Buster. When the time comes for Clay to take the stage, he claims that he is not ready yet. Ash leads the crowd in a rendition of one of Clay's songs, giving him the courage to perform. After the curtain call, Jimmy tries to take credit for the show only for Suki to have him arrested by the police.

Just as Buster and his friends begin to return home the following morning, Suki stops them and tells them that The Majestic wants to put on their show. As the cast puts on its first official performance, Buster watches from the VIP section, proud to have succeeded in Redshore City.

Voice cast

 Matthew McConaughey as Buster Moon, a koala who owns the New Moon Theater
 Reese Witherspoon as Rosita, a pig who gave up her music dreams to become a devoted housewife and mother of 25 piglets, but who now does both
 Scarlett Johansson as Ash, a porcupine punk rock guitarist
 Taron Egerton as Johnny, a teenage gorilla who left his father's ex-criminal gang to become a singer and pianist
 Bobby Cannavale as Jimmy Crystal, a white wolf and media owner who runs Crystal Entertainment
 Tori Kelly as Meena, a teenage elephant with an exquisite singing voice, who previously overcame severe stage fright from the first film
 Nick Kroll as Gunter, a passionate dancing pig and Rosita's dance partner
 Pharrell Williams as Alfonso, an elephant and ice cream vendor who becomes Meena's love interest
 Halsey as Porsha Crystal, a wolf and the seemingly spoiled daughter of Jimmy
 Chelsea Peretti as Suki Lane, Jimmy's haughty dog assistant and talent scout
 Letitia Wright as Nooshy, a lynx street dancer who helps Johnny regain his confidence while he learns his choreography
 Eric André as Darius, an egocentric yak who is cast in the stage production opposite Meena in a romantic duet
 Adam Buxton as Klaus Kickenklober, a proboscis monkey and strict dance instructor
 Garth Jennings as Miss Crawly, an elderly iguana with a glass eye who works as Buster's assistant
 Jennings also voices the bus terminal and the airbag from a rental car
 Peter Serafinowicz as Big Daddy, a mobster gorilla and Johnny's father who is now on work release
 Jennifer Saunders as Nana Noodleman, a sheep and a famous singer
 Nick Offerman as Norman, a pig and Rosita's workaholic husband
 Bono as Clay Calloway, a white-maned aged lion who was once a rock star legend until his wife, Ruby, died

In addition, Julia Davis voices Linda le Bon, a horse and host of a talk show, while Spike Jonze has an uncredited voice role as Jerry, a cat who is Jimmy's personal assistant.

Amongst the voices of Rosita and Norman's piglets is Matthew McConaughey's daughter, Vida Alves McConaughey, who voices the piglet that goes splashing in chocolate. Director Jennings' wife, Louise Jennings, voices a dog worker making Meena's costume for the show, while the couple's four children, Asa, Caspar, Leo and Oscar Jennings, are among the piglet voices.

As with the first film, Jennings' filmmaker friends Wes Anderson, Chris Renaud, and Edgar Wright all have cameos in the film, with Anderson as a tarsier night cleaner, Renaud as Linda Le Bon's show announcer, and Wright voicing a dog cop and a pig chauffeur. Scott Mosier, director of The Grinch and director of the short film Eddie's Life Coach, voices Mason, a walrus worker making the sets for the show.

Production

On January 25, 2017, Universal Pictures and Illumination announced a sequel to its 2016 animated film Sing was in development. Writer/director Garth Jennings and producers Chris Meledandri and Janet Healy return along with voiceover stars Matthew McConaughey, Reese Witherspoon, Scarlett Johansson, Nick Kroll, Taron Egerton and Tori Kelly.

In December 2020, Bobby Cannavale, Letitia Wright, Eric André, Chelsea Peretti, longtime Illumination collaborator Pharrell Williams, Bono and Halsey were added to the voice cast. Work on the film shifted due to the COVID-19 pandemic, and was done remotely following the temporary closure of Illumination Mac Guff (now renamed as Illumination Studios Paris).

The scope of the theatre in the finale was a major stepping stone to take over 10,000 animals for the crowd department, old and new ones designed by longtime Illumination artist Eric Guillon who not only worked on Sing but also designed the new characters in the sequel like choreographer Klaus and the tarsiers. Fashion brand Rodarte designed some of the costumes used in the film.

Music

In December 2020, Joby Talbot returned to compose the score. U2 performed the film's original song "Your Song Saved My Life". The song was released on November 3, 2021. Additional music includes songs by Kiana Ledé, Sam i, Billie Eilish, Elton John and more. The film's soundtrack was released on December 17, 2021.

Release

Theatrical and home media
Sing 2 had its world premiere, opening the AFI Fest Celebration on November 14, 2021, and was theatrically released in the United States on December 22, 2021, in RealD 3D, due to the COVID-19 pandemic, after previously being scheduled to be released in the United States on December 25, 2020, and July 2, 2021. Early access screenings occurred in the United States on November 27, 2021. The film was released to video on January 7, 2022, on platforms such as Amazon Prime Video, Apple TV, Vudu, Xfinity, and YouTube. It was released on Blu-ray, DVD, and Ultra HD Blu-ray on March 29, 2022, by Universal Pictures Home Entertainment.

Marketing
Tomy made a deal with Illumination and Universal to develop the Sing 2 toy line, featuring plush toys, collectible figures, and a role-playing game. Roblox released an Adopt Me! live event in partnership with Illumination to promote this film. The film also has many promotional partners including Xfinity, McDonald's, and Mercari. By its opening weekend in the United States and Canada, the film had made 393.1 million impressions across all social media platforms, a statistic 24% above those of a film released before the COVID-19 pandemic. Overall, the film had a better social media reach than 2021's Encanto, The Addams Family 2, Tom & Jerry, Spirit Untamed, and The Croods: A New Age.

Reception

Box office 
Sing 2 grossed $162.8million in the United States and Canada, and $245.6million in other territories, for a worldwide total of $408.4 million.

In the United States and Canada, the film earned $1.6 million from sneak previews held on November 27, 2021. The film had its wide release the following month on Wednesday, December 22, alongside The King's Man and The Matrix Resurrections, and was projected to gross $40–50 million from 3,892 theaters over its first five days of release. The film ended up grossing $22.3 million in its opening weekend (and a total of $41 million over the five-day frame) from an estimated 4.1 million theater admissions, placing second at the box office behind Spider-Man: No Way Home. Women made up 58% of the audience during its opening, with those below the age of 25 comprising 56% of ticket sales and those below 17 comprising 44%. The ethnic breakdown of the audience showed that 39% were Hispanic and Latino Americans, 35% European Americans, 15% African American, and 7% Asian or other. In its second weekend, the film remained in second place with $20.2 million. Sing 2 once again retained second place at the box office in its third weekend with $11.6 million. On January 8, 2022, Sing 2 became the first animated film of the COVID-19 pandemic to cross $100 million at the U.S. and Canadian box office as well as the first film since Frozen II (2019) to reach this milestone. It remained atop the box office top ten until its fifteenth weekend.

Outside the United States and Canada, Sing 2 opened in several international markets on December 3, 2021. The film made $1.12 million in its first weekend, $1.5 million in its second, and another $1.5 million from 16 markets in its third. After screening in an additional 22 markets, Sing 2 earned $19.2 million in its fourth weekend and had the biggest opening for an animated film during the COVID-19 pandemic in both France ($6 million) and Mexico ($3.6 million). The film made $17.2 million in its fifth weekend, which included a $1.2 million opening in Ukraine, $17.1 million in its sixth weekend, and $8.4 million in its seventh weekend. In its eighth weekend, the film had strong openings in Germany ($3 million), Poland ($2.4 million), and Austria ($500,000). In its ninth weekend, the film earned $17.4 million from 62 markets, which included a $9.3 million opening in the U.K. In its tenth weekend, the film earned $14 million from 63 markets, which included a $1.1 million debut in the country of Denmark where pandemic restrictions had recently been lifted. The film crossed the $300 million mark worldwide in its eleventh weekend after adding $11 million to its total, which included a $2.2 million debut in the Netherlands. The film's gross remained consistent in its twelfth weekend with $10.3 million that included a 1% drop in the U.K. Sing 2 crossed the $200 million mark outside the U.S. and Canada in its thirteenth weekend. By March 6, the film had surpassed the original film's gross in the U.K. with $40.5 million. In its fifteenth weekend, the film added $3 million to its total gross and the Sing franchise as a whole passed the $1 billion mark. The film made $6.1 million in its sixteenth weekend, which included a $4.3 million opening in Japan. It added $3.6 million in its seventeenth weekend. The film crossed the $400 million mark worldwide with the addition of $1.9 million in its nineteenth weekend. It is the first film since Frozen II, the first animated film during the pandemic, and the ninth Illumination title to reach the milestone. It made $1.2 million the following weekend.

Critical response
  Audiences polled by CinemaScore gave the film a rare average grade of "A+" on an A+ to F scale (the first Illumination film to receive this grade), while PostTrak reported 91% of audience members gave it a positive score, with 78% saying they would definitely recommend it.

Justin Lowe, writing for The Hollywood Reporter, praised the musical set of the film, calling the "ragtag cast that Buster had brought for an amateur cast, had blossomed into a full-fledged company of professional performers". Peter Debruge, of Variety, also gave a positive review, saying the film is "an elaborate machinery of joy, and it's easier to appreciate how every choice seems designed to put a smile on people's faces". 

However, a few reviewers were disappointed by the film. Emily Clark of Plugged In praised the film's inspiring and emotional elements, but took issue with the fact that Meena "clearly tells Buster she’s not OK kissing someone on stage, and he sort of dismisses her...The whole affair made me a bit queasy thinking about how many a young starlet has received her first smooch from a total stranger at the behest of adult directors and producers." Mark Kermode, who had given the first film a positive review, stated that Sing 2 overused its flashier technical effects and lacked the "homemade charm" that characterized the first film.

Accolades

Notes

References

External Links

 
 

2021 films
2021 comedy films
2021 computer-animated films
2020s American animated films
2020s English-language films
2020s musical comedy films
American computer-animated films
American musical comedy films
American sequel films
Animated films about animals
Animated musical films
Jukebox musical films
Films about performing arts
Films postponed due to the COVID-19 pandemic
Films produced by Chris Meledandri
Films produced by Janet Healy
Films directed by Garth Jennings
Films set in a theatre
Illumination (company) animated films
Universal Pictures animated films
Universal Pictures films